The 2018 FIA GT Nations Cup was the first edition of the FIA GT Nations Cup held at Bahrain International Circuit on 1 December 2018. The race was contested with GT3-spec cars. Only Silver and Bronze drivers were allowed to compete. The event promoters were the Bahrain Motorsport Federation (BMF) and the Stéphane Ratel Organisation (SRO). For the following year the event was reformatted as the multi-discipline FIA Motorsport Games.

Entry list

Results

Main race

See also
2018 GT4 International Cup

Notes

References

External links

FIA GT Nations Cup
FIA GT Nations Cup
FIA GT Nations Cup